The 1993 Women's Intercontinental Cup was a qualifier for the 1994 Women's Hockey World Cup and was held in Philadelphia, Pennsylvania, from July 15 until July 25, 1993. Twelve nations took part, and they were divided into two groups of six in the preliminary round. The top five teams will join the other six that have already qualified: Australia, China, England, hosts Ireland, the Netherlands, Olympic champions Spain, and South Korea.

Final standings
 *
 *
 *
 *
 *

Remarks
The first five (Germany, Argentina, Canada, Russia and the United States) participated in the 1994 Women's Hockey World Cup in Dublin, Republic of Ireland.

References

External links
Overview on FIH-site

1993
1993 in women's field hockey
1993 in American women's sports
1993 Women's Intercontinental Cup
1993 in sports in Pennsylvania
July 1993 sports events in the United States
Women's sports in Pennsylvania